Curtis Joseph Marsh Jr. (born March 1, 1988) is a former American football cornerback. He was originally drafted by the Philadelphia Eagles in the third round of the 2011 NFL Draft. Marsh was released by the Philadelphia Eagles at the end of the 2013 preseason and signed by the Cincinnati Bengals. He played college football at Utah State.

Marsh's father, Curtis, played wide receiver in the NFL for three seasons.

Early years
Born in West Hills, California, and raised by his mother, Trayci Gibson with his sister M'haganee Kahlil Gibson. Marsh graduated from Royal High School in Simi Valley, California in 2006. Marsh received a football scholarship to the Naval Academy Preparatory School after graduating from high school. Marsh left the school after three months and received a scholarship offer from Utah State University.

College career
With the Utah State Aggies, Marsh began his career as a running back and became a cornerback starting in junior year. Marsh rushed 82 times for 302 yards as a freshman in 2007 in 10 games (3 starts) and 42 times for 185 as a sophomore in 12 games (3 starts) in 2008. In each season, Marsh scored two touchdowns. As a cornerback in 2009, Marsh made 32 tackles (23 solo, 9 assisted), deflected five passes, and intercepted one pass. In the November 14, 2009 game against San Jose State, Marsh blocked a punt. As a senior in 2010, Marsh made 45 tackles (37 solo, 8 assisted) and 2 interceptions.

Marsh received second-team All-Western Athletic Conference honors after his senior season. Marsh graduated from Utah State in 2011 with a degree in business and economics.

Professional career

Philadelphia Eagles
Marsh was drafted by the Philadelphia Eagles with the 90th pick of the 2011 NFL Draft. He played all four preseason games and made his regular season debut on Week 11 of 2011 (November 20), a 17-10 win over the New York Giants. In seven games in 2011, Marsh made 2 tackles and one defended pass.

Cincinnati Bengals
Marsh signed with the Cincinnati Bengals on September 18, 2013. He was released by the Bengals on October 1, 2013.

Philadelphia Eagles
Marsh was signed by the Philadelphia Eagles on November 5, 2013. He was released by the Eagles on August 30, 2014.

Denver Broncos
Marsh signed with the Denver Broncos on December 30, 2014.

Marsh was waived on September 15, 2015 to make room for T. J. Ward who was suspended for the first game of the season.

References

External links

Philadelphia Eagles bio
Utah State Aggies football bio

1988 births
Living people
People from Simi Valley, California
Players of American football from Los Angeles
American football cornerbacks
American football running backs
Utah State Aggies football players
Philadelphia Eagles players
Cincinnati Bengals players
Denver Broncos players
People from West Hills, Los Angeles
Sportspeople from Ventura County, California